Örn Arnarson (born 31 August 1981 in Reykjavík) is a swimmer from Iceland. He won his first major title in 1998 at the European SC Championships in Sheffield. There he captured the title in the 200 m backstroke.

A year later, at the European SC Championships 1999 in Lisbon, Portugal, Örn Arnarson won the 100 m and 200 m backstroke swimming events.

Örn Arnarson has participated in three Olympics in 2000, 2004, and 2008. He is the first Icelandic male swimmer ever to participate in the finals for the Olympics back in 2000 when he came 4th place in the 200m backstroke.

In late 2008, Örn Arnarson moved to Denmark, where he became the Elite Coach at Aalborg Svømmeklub Elitehold. After working for other swimming clubs in Denmark, Örn Arnarson moved to the west coast to work at Esbjerg Svømmeklub. In 2017, Örn Arnarson received the award for Årets Årgangs Juniortræner at Dansk Svømme Award 2017.

In December 2016, Örn Arnarson got engaged to Vinni Bay.

References

External links
 

1981 births
Living people
Örn Arnarson
Icelandic male backstroke swimmers
Örn Arnarson
Swimmers at the 2000 Summer Olympics
Swimmers at the 2004 Summer Olympics
Swimmers at the 2008 Summer Olympics
World Aquatics Championships medalists in swimming
Örn Arnarson